In Greece the driving licence is a governmental right given to those who request a licence for any of the categories they desire. It is required for every type of motorised vehicle. The minimum age to obtain a driving licence is sixteen years for a motorcycle, eighteen years for a car, and twenty-one years of age for buses and cargo vehicles .

Obtaining a driver's licence
The Greek driving licence can be obtained after finishing a driving school and passing a two-stage test, the theory test and road test. A primary school diploma is also required to obtain a valid driving licence.

Gallery of historic images

See also
European driving licence
Vehicle registration plates of Greece

Road transport in Greece
Greece